The Pak Business Express (or Pakistan Business Express) (often abbreviated as Business Express) is a daily express train service between Karachi and Lahore. It was inaugurated by the Prime Minister Yusuf Raza Gilani on 4 January 2012.

History
The Pak Business Express was the brainchild of the Lahore Chamber of Commerce & Industry. Initially Pakistan Railways started it with collaboration of a private company Four Brothers Private Limited. The private company provided modern facilitates like LCD TVs, Wi-Fi Internet, water dispensers and lavish food on train first time in Pakistan.

But due to financial dispute on 29 October 2015 Pakistan Railways has ended joint venture with Four Brother Private Limited and take control of Business Express. Now this train is running under Pakistan Railways management.

Route
 Karachi Cantonment–Lahore Junction via Karachi–Peshawar Railway Line

Station stops
 Karachi Cantonment
 Hyderabad Junction
 Nawabshah Junction
 Rohri Junction
 Rahim Yar Khan
 Khanewal Junction
 Lahore Junction

Equipment
The train has AC Business, AC Standard, and Economy class coaches.

References

External links
 

2012 establishments in Pakistan
Named passenger trains of Pakistan
Passenger trains in Pakistan
Government of Yousaf Raza Gillani